Equatorial Congo Airlines SA, operating as ECAir, was an airline headquartered in Brazzaville; it was the flag carrier of the Republic of the Congo. The airline suspended all operations on 10 October 2016.

History
ECAir was created with the support of the Congolese Government to serve as a locomotive for the modernization of the aviation sector in the region. Crews and technical support for ECAir were provided by Geneva-based VIP business carrier PrivatAir. and thus ECAir avoided being included in the list of air carriers banned in the European Union, which applied to all airlines with maintenance services executed in the Republic of the Congo.

Operations commenced on 24 September 2010, the company having taken delivery of its first aircraft, a Boeing 737-300. It took delivery of a second Boeing 737-300 in February 2012. On 24 August 2012 ECAir launched its first international route, Brazzaville – Paris-CDG, offering 4-weekly service on board a PrivatAir Boeing 757 aircraft.

On 14 November 2014 the Belgian airline Jetairfly sealed a wet-lease deal to provide up to four aircraft with crew to operate on behalf of ECAir from mid 2015 on. Widebody operations were launched in February 2015 with the wet-lease of a Boeing 767-300ER from PrivatAir to be used on the Brazzaville to Paris service (4-weekly service). The delivery of a Boeing 787-8 was expected in the first half of 2016, with plans to open new routes to China and the United States.

The airline suspended all operations on 10 October 2016 until further notice after the responsible air navigation provider ceased all services to EC Air over unpaid debts. PrivatAir, which operated several routes on behalf of ECAir, also ended all services for the airline.

ECAir was reportedly looking to restart operations in the first quarter of 2019.
In late 2020, plans to scrap some of their planes were also revealed.

Corporate affairs

Head office

ECAir had its corporate headquarters at ECAir House, Maya Maya Airport, Brazzaville.

Ownership and structure
Since its creation, ECAir had been 70% owned by the Government of the Republic of the Congo, 15% by the seaport of Pointe-Noire and 15% by Heli-Avia company. To launch the airline, the Government engaged Lufthansa Consulting, which managed the complete start-up process preparation, and developed a five-year business plan, including future network and fleet structure for the new airline. From the outset, all cockpit crews and some cabin crews and technical support for ECAir were provided by Geneva-based carrier PrivatAir. After Lufthansa Consulting was phased out, the airline obtained specialised consultancy services mainly via the Swiss company  CoeM.

Business trends
The airline commenced operating in September 2011, and it was reported that the carrier's business plan does not expect it to become profitable until its third year of operation, i.e. 2014. No annual reports have been published, and the main sources for business information are press releases and reports. According to Swiss journalist Marc Renfer in an article published on official media, ECAir lost over 450 million Euros between 2011 and 2016.

Destinations

Fleet

Current Fleet
As of December 2017 the Equatorial Congo Airlines fleet consisted of the following aircraft:

Former fleet
As of October 2016, the ECAir fleet consisted of the following aircraft:

References

Defunct airlines of the Republic of the Congo
Airlines established in 2011
2011 establishments in the Republic of the Congo
Organisations based in Brazzaville